An Information Technology Assistant (commonly abbreviated to IT Assistant) is a person who works as an assistant in the IT business.

Because the term "Information Technology" is commonly abbreviated "IT", job seekers recruiters often use the abbreviated version of the title.

Information Technology Assistant 

Distinguishing Characteristics:
Receives supervision and direction from the Information Technology Manager and Network Specialist. May require flexible work schedules including early morning, weekend and evening hours.

Qualifications 
Applicants should have:
 Bachelor or associate degree in Information Technology or related field like Computer Science, Electronics, Software, Information Systems, Telecommunication, Electrical or a diploma/certificate in Information Technology, Computing Studies or a related discipline;
 Two years’ post-qualification experience in help desk services; and
 Good interpersonal and communication skills.
IT Certifications to look for are CompTIA, Cisco, Microsoft and W3Schools depending on the project or information systems maintenance needs.

Duties 
As an Information Technology Assistant, user problems should be resolved by communicating with end users and by translating technical problems from end-users to technical support staff. You would install hardware, software, and peripherals; run diagnostic software; utilize mainframe and/or client server software to provide system security access; and accommodate user requests for computer hardware and software.

References 

Computer occupations